Brigadier Robert Hugh Willan,  (6 September 1882 – 4 May 1960) was an officer in the British Army.

Willan was a lieutenant in the 4th (Militia) Battalion of the Oxfordshire Light Infantry when he received a commission as second lieutenant in The King's Royal Rifle Corps on 7 May 1902.

He served in the First World War and was awarded the Distinguished Service Order (DSO) in 1916 and the Military Cross (MC).

He was Commander of the 10th Infantry Brigade, 1934–38 and concurrently Aide-de-camp to Kings George V, Edward VIII and George VI.

He married Violet Crabbe, daughter of Brigadier General Eyre Crabbe. They had two sons: Martin Stuart Willan was killed in action during the fall of France in 1940; the other was (Frank) Andrew Willan, RAF officer and Tory local politician.

He died in 1960 and his funeral was held in Salisbury.

References

1882 births
1960 deaths
British Army personnel of World War I
British Army personnel of World War II
British Militia officers
Companions of the Distinguished Service Order
King's Royal Rifle Corps officers
Recipients of the Military Cross